Phorone, or diisopropylidene acetone, is a yellow crystalline substance with a geranium odor, with formula  or .

Preparation
It was first obtained in 1837 in impure form by the French chemist Auguste Laurent, who called it "camphoryle". In 1849, the French chemist Charles Frédéric Gerhardt and his student Jean Pierre Liès-Bodart prepared it in a pure state and named it "phorone". On both occasions it was produced by ketonization through the dry distillation of the calcium salt of camphoric acid.

It is now typically obtained by the acid-catalysed twofold aldol condensation of three molecules of acetone. Mesityl oxide is obtained as an intermediate and can be isolated.

Crude phorone can be purified by repeated recrystallization from ethanol or ether, in which it is soluble.

Reactions
Phorone can condense with ammonia to form triacetone amine.

See also
Isophorone

References
Merck Index, 11th Edition, 7307.

External links
International Chemical Safety Cards

Ketones
Alkene derivatives